The Stiglitz Report: Reforming the International Monetary and Financial Systems in the Wake of the Global Crisis is a book on economics written by Nobel Laureate economist Joseph Stiglitz, documenting the necessary changes and reforms of the international financial institutions in the wake of the financial crisis of 2007–2008, and the subsequent Great Recession arisen from it.

In October 2008, the President of the General Assembly of the United Nations, Miguel d'Escoto Brockmann, established the "Commission of Experts of the President of the UN General Assembly on Reforms of the International Monetary and Financial System" chaired by author and Nobel Laureate economist Joseph E. Stiglitz. This commission had the aim of proposing necessary reforms in the world financial system that would prevent another event like the financial crisis of 2007–2008. The report frames the crisis as part of a series of simultaneous crisis, those of energy crisis, food crisis, water scarcity, and sustainability.

Besides Stiglitz, members of the commission included Andrei Bougrov, Yousef Boutros-Ghali, Jean-Paul Fitoussi, Charles Goodhart, Robert Johnson, Jomo Kwame Sundaram, Benno Ndulo, José Antonio Ocampo, Pedro Páez, Avinash Persaud, Yaga Venugopal Reddy, Rubens Ricupero, Eisuke Sakakibara, Chukwuma Soludo, Heidemarie Wieczorek-Zeul, Yu Yongding and Zeti Akhtar Aziz. Jan Kregel acted as rapporteur.

The report goes through four main topics:

 Macroeconomic Issues and Perspectives
 Reforming Global Regulation to Enhance Global Economic Stability
 International Institutions
 International Financial Innovations
The concluding comments of the report blame flawed policies as well as unsound economic philosophies for the crisis. The report advocates for the global community to "work for a robust and sustainable recovery" and for changes that support "long-term, democratic, equitable, stable, and sustainable growth".

References

External links
 The Stiglitz Report, The New Press, New York, 2010, 
 
 http://www.un.org/ga/president/63/commission/background.shtml

Great Recession
Books by Joseph Stiglitz